Sisyra nigra is a species of spongillafly in the family Sisyridae. It is found in Europe and Northern Asia (excluding China) and North America.

References

Further reading

External links

 

Hemerobiiformia
Articles created by Qbugbot
Insects described in 1783